Burgauenbach  is a river of Saxony, Germany. It flows into the Bauerngraben in Lützschena-Stahmeln.

See also
List of rivers of Saxony

Rivers of Saxony
Rivers of Germany